Nikos Gelestathis (1930 – 30 August 2020) was a Greek lawyer and politician. Gelestathis served as the Minister of Public Order from 1992 to 1993 and the Minister of Transport and Communications from 1990 to 1992. He was a member of the Hellenic Parliament for New Democracy for 23 years, from 1981 until 2004. He was first elected in parliament in 1981 and won re-election in 1985, the June and November 1989 elections, 1990, 1993, 1996 and 2000.  

Gelestathis was born in Desfina and studied law at the National and Kapodistrian University of Athens.

Gelestathis died in Athens on 30 August 2020, at the age of 90.

References

1930 births
2020 deaths
20th-century Greek lawyers
Ministers of Public Order of Greece
Government ministers of Greece
Greek MPs 1981–1985
Greek MPs 1985–1989
Greek MPs 1989 (June–November)
Greek MPs 1989–1990
Greek MPs 1990–1993
Greek MPs 1993–1996
Greek MPs 1996–2000
Greek MPs 2000–2004
New Democracy (Greece) politicians
National and Kapodistrian University of Athens alumni
People from Phocis
Ministers of Transport and Communications of Greece